The Order of Luthuli is a South African honour. It was instituted on 30 November 2003, and is granted by the president of South Africa, for contributions to South Africa in the following fields:  (i) the struggle for democracy, (ii) building democracy and human rights, (iii) nation-building, (iv) justice and peace, and (v) conflict resolution.  It has three classes:
 Gold (OLG), for exceptional contributions,
 Silver (OLS), for excellent contributions,
 Bronze (OLB), for outstanding contributions.

The order is named after former African National Congress leader Chief Albert Luthuli, who was South Africa's first Nobel Peace Prize winner.

The badge of the order is an equilateral triangle representing a flintstone above a clay pot.  The flintstone depicts the sun rising above Isandhlwana, and the national flag, and it is flanked by two animal horns rising out of the clay pot, which bears the initials AL.  Isandhlwana symbolises peace and tranquillity, and the leopardskin bands around the bases of the horns represent Chief Luthuli's headdress. The South African coat of arms is displayed on the reverse.

The ribbon is gold with a stripe of cream-coloured AL monograms down each edge, and recurring cream-coloured outlines of the flintstone, depicting the national flag, down the centre.  All three classes are worn around the neck.

Members

2003
Mosell Molaoa, OLG  Posthumous
Ambassador John Kgwana Nkadimeng, OLG 
Alfred Nzo, OLG  Posthumous
Mary Burton, OLS 
Professor Willie Esterhuyse, OLS 
Matthew Goniwe, OLS Posthumous
Mthuli ka Shezi, OLS Posthumous
Winnie Kgware, OLS Posthumous
Jafta Kgalabi Masemola, OLS Posthumous
Lekgau Mathabathe, OLS Posthumous
Phillis Naidoo, OLS
Father Albert Nolan, OLS
Jasmat Nanabhai, OLB

2004
Hilda Bernstein, OLG
Zachariah Keodirelang Matthews, OLG  Posthumous 
Thomas Titus Nkobi, OLG  Posthumous
Solomon Tshekisho Plaatje, OLG  Posthumous 
Laloo Chiba, OLS
Clarence Mlamli Makwetu, OLS
Mapetla Mohapi, OLS  Posthumous 
Josie (Palmer) Mpama, OLS  Posthumous 
Billy Nair, OLS
Rita Alice Ndzanga, OLS
Joseph (Joe) Mbuku Nhlanhla, OLS
Reginald (Reggie) September, OLS
Dan Tloome, OLS  Posthumous 
Stephen (Steve) Vukile Tshwete, OLS  Posthumous 
Amina Cachalia, OLB
Frans Rasimphi Tshivhase, OLB  Posthumous

2005
Flag Marutle Boshielo, OLG
John Langalibalele Dube, OLG  Posthumous 
Anton Muziwakhe Lembede, OLG  Posthumous 
Isaac Bangani Tabata, OLG  Posthumous 
Edward Joseph Daniels, OLS
Frene Noshir Ginwala, OLS
Archibald Gumede, OLS  Posthumous 
Fish Keitseng, OLS  Posthumous 
Kwedie Mzingisi Zilindile Mkalipi, OLS
Abdullah Mohamed Omar, OLS  Posthumous 
Madimetja Laurence Phokanoka, OLS
Mildred Ramakaba-Lesiea, OLS
Archibald Sibeko also known as Zola Zembe, OLS
Christmas Fihla Tinto, OLS
Dorothy Nomazotsho Zihlangu, OLS  Posthumous

2006
Joe Nzingo Gqabi, OLS  Posthumous
Fort Calata, OLS  Posthumous
Isaac Lesiba Maphotho, OLS 
Amina Pahad, OLS  Posthumous
Albert Louis Sachs, OLS
Ama Naidoo, OLS  Posthumous
Pixley Seme, OLS  Posthumous
Sicelo Mhlauli, OLS  Posthumous 
Anthony Sampson, OLS  Posthumous 
John Tengo Jabavu, OLS  Posthumous 
Sparrow Mkhonto, OLS  Posthumous

2007
Gert Shadrack Sibande, OLG  Posthumous
Florence Mophosho, OLS  Posthumous
Johnstone Mfanafuthi Makatini, OLS  Posthumous
Mfanasekaya Pearce Linda Gqobose, OLS
Dr Gagathura Mohambry Naicker, OLS  Posthumous 
John James Issel, OLB
Emma Thandi Mashinini, OLB
Rica Hodgson, OLB

2008
James Arthur Calata, OLG  Posthumous
Robert Resha, OLG  Posthumous
Walter Rubusana, OLG  Posthumous
Himan Bernadt, OLS  Posthumous
Bertha Gxowa, OLS
Josiah Jele, OLS
Zolile Malindi, OLS
Barbara Masekela, OLS
Nana Henrietta Moabi, OLS
Billy Modise, OLS
Mlungisi Griffiths Mxenge and Victoria Nonyamezelo, OLS
Magdalene Maggie Resha, OLS  Posthumous 
Chanderdeo George Sewpershad, OLS  Posthumous 
Vesta Smith, OLS

2009
Brian Bunting, OLS Posthumous
Tlou Theophilus Cholo, OLS
Denis Theodore Goldberg, OLS
James Arnold (Jimmy) la Guma, OLS Posthumous
Rebecca Makgomo Masilela, OLS Posthumous
Kader Asmal, OLB
Jacqueline Daane-van Rensburg, OLB
Ayesha (Bibi) Dawood (Yusuf Mukadam), OLB
Mirriam Hlazo, OLB
Lydia Komape-Ngwenya, OLB
Nomhlangano Beauty Mkhize, OLB

2010
Stephen Dlamini, OLG
Sonia Beryl Bunting, OLS Posthumous
Dorothy “Dot” Cleminshaw, OLS
Jameson Nongolozi Mngomezulu, OLS
Jabulani Nobleman Nxumalo, OLS Posthumous
James Randolph Vigne, OLS

2011
Lionel “Rusty” Bernstein, OLG Posthumous
Nelson Diale, OLS
Ismael Chota Meer, OLS
Florence Elizabeth Mnumzana, OLS
Harriet Bolton, OLB
Margaret Gazo, OLB
Tsietsi Mashinini, OLB Posthumous
Violet Sarah Matlou (née Phiri), OLB

2012
Josiah Tshangana Gumede, OLG Posthumous
Zaccheus Richard Mahabane, OLG Posthumous
Sefako Mapogo Makgatho, OLG Posthumous
James Sebebubijwasekgogobontharile Moroka, OLG Posthumous
Alfred Bitini Xuma, OLG Posthumous
John Stephen Gomas, OLS Posthumous
Elizabeth Sophia Honman, OLS PosthumousReverend Fenner Christian Kadalie, OLS Posthumous 
Peter Ramoshoane Mokaba, OLS Posthumous2013
Nkosazana Dlamini Zuma, OLG
Dr Neville Edward Alexander, OLS PosthumousAmina Desai, OLS PosthumousMichael Alan Harmel, OLS PosthumousEssop Essak Jassat, OLS
Arthur Letele, OLS PosthumousMosibudi Mangena, OLS
David Fani Mncube, OLS
Moosa (Mosie) Moolla, OLS
Elias Phakane Moretsele, OLS PosthumousRichard Mothupi, OLS
Nomazizi Mtshotshisa, OLB Posthumous2014
Frances Baard, OLG PosthumousDavid Wilcox Hlahane Bopape, OLG PosthumousRuth First, OLG PosthumousImam Abdullah Haron, OLG PosthumousSir Bob Hepple, OLG
Florence Matomela, OLG PosthumousZephania Lekoane Mothopeng, OLG PosthumousAbdhulhay Jassat, OLS
Wolfie Kodesh, OLS PosthumousFather Simangaliso Mkhatshwa, OLS
Popo Molefe, OLS
Agnes Msimang, OLS
Jeanette Schoon, OLS PosthumousZola Sydney Themba Skweyiya, OLS
Mittah Seperepere, OLB Posthumous2015
William Henry Frankel, OBE, OLS
Johnson Malcomess Mgabela, OLS PosthumousJabulile Nyawose, OLS PosthumousPetros Nyawose, OLS PosthumousMohammed Tikly, OLS
Kay Moonsamy, OLB

2016
Cleopas Madoda Nsibande, OLG PosthumousBrian Francis Bishop, OLS PosthumousMsizi Harrison Dube, OLS PosthumousRev Dr Simon Gqubule, OLS
Winnie Madikizela-Mandela, OLS
Sathyandranath Ragunanan “Mac” Maharaj, OLS
Mary Thipe, OLS PosthumousAmy Rietstein Thornton, OLS
John Zikhali, OLS PosthumousSuliman “Babla” Saloojee, OLB Posthumous2017
The 22 ANC Political Trialists of 1969
Miltha Mary “Mamou” Calata, OLS PosthumousDavid Mbulelo “Spi” Grootboom, OLS PosthumousMatsobane Morris Matsemela, OLS 
Professor Fatima Meer, OLS PosthumousCollen Monde Mkunqwana, OLS PosthumousZodwa Mofokeng, OLS PosthumousReginald “Reggie” Oliphant, OLS PosthumousNeville Rubin, OLS PosthumousZweli Lucas Sizani, OLS Posthumous2018
Inkosi Mhlabunzima Joseph Maphumulo, OLG PosthumousJustice Dikgang Ernest Moseneke, OLG
Godfrey Kenneth Beck, OLS PosthumousSylvia Motlagomang ‘Mamza’ Benjamin, OLB PosthumousRonald Bernickow, OLB PosthumousLillian Lily Diedericks, OLS
Professor Farid Esack, OLS
Mary Fitzgerald, OLS PosthumousSwaminathan ‘Swami’ Karuppa Gounden, OLS
Reverend Charles Hooper, OLS PosthumousSibongile Mkhabela, OLS
Major General Keith Mokoape, OLS
General Maomela Moreti Motau, OLS
Rahima Moosa, OLS PosthumousZondeni Veronica Sobukwe, OLS
Dora Tamana, OLS Posthumous2019
Ambassador Thandi Lujabe-Rankoe, OLS 
Brigadier General Velaphi Msane, OLS 
Antony Andrew Trew, OLS 
Moyisile Douglas Tyutyu, OLS 
Yosuf Veriava, OLS

See also
 Hilda Bernstein
 South African civil honours

References
 South African Government Gazette'' No 25799 (2 December 2003)
 South African Government website

Citations

External links
  South African government website
 South African Medals Website
 Order of Luthuli: Organization, Symbolism, Design, and Members

Orders of South Africa

2003 establishments in South Africa
Awards established in 2003